Conus vidua, common name the vidua cone, is a species of sea snail, a marine gastropod mollusk in the family Conidae, the cone snails, cone shells or cones.

These snails are predatory and venomous. They are capable of "stinging" humans.
Subspecies
 Conus vidua cuyoensis Lorenz & Barbier, 2012
 Conus vidua vidua Reeve, 1843
Forma and varieties brought into synonymy
 Conus vidua f. mozoii L. S. Melvin, 1980: synonym of Conus bandanus Hwass in Bruguière, 1792
 Conus vidua var. azona Wils, 1972: synonym of Conus thalassiarchus G. B. Sowerby I, 1834
 Conus vidua var. depriesteri Wils, 1972: synonym of Conus thalassiarchus G. B. Sowerby I, 1834

Description
The size of the shell varies between 42 mm and 150 mm. This species is closely related to Conus araneosus nicobaricus Hwass in Bruguière, 1792, but the bands not so well outlined usually, and are scattered with triangular white spots upon them.

Distribution
This marine species occurs off the Philippines.

References

 Lorenz F. & Barbier J.P. (2012) Two new cones from the Philippines (Gastropoda: Conidae). Acta Conchyliorum 11: 3-10.

External links
 To World Register of Marine Species
 Cone Shells - Knights of the Sea
 
 Holotype of  Conus vidua cuyoensis in MNHN, Paris

vidua
Gastropods described in 1843